The 2006 college football season may refer to:

 2006 NCAA Division I FBS football season
 2006 NCAA Division I FCS football season
 2006 NCAA Division II football season
 2006 NCAA Division III football season
 2006 NAIA Football National Championship